Cosmo is the first solo studio album by former Creedence Clearwater Revival drummer Doug Clifford, released shortly after that band's breakup.

Background
In a 2012 interview, Clifford was critical of the album:

On June 22, 2018, the album was reissued by Craft Recordings (along with fellow Creedence alumni Tom Fogerty's second solo album, Excalibur). In an interview with Forbes, Clifford described the recording process as a positive experience: “Making this record was a blast because it was a superstar line-up,” Clifford said, “It was a collaboration to a large degree. I told everyone that I was open to any ideas they might have. That got everybody involved in the process. The camaraderie was great, there was no pressure and that got the best performances from everyone. We cut everything live, so when the horns were playing we were a 10-piece band!”

Track listing
All songs written by Doug Clifford, except where noted
"Latin Music" – 3:11
"Regret It (For the Rest of Your Life)" – 2:23
"Guitars, Drums, and Girls" – 2:07
"I'm a Man" (Jimmy Miller, Steve Winwood) – 2:25
"She's About a Mover" (Doug Sahm) – 2:27
"I Just Want to Cry" – 2:48
"Get Your Raise" – 2:31
"Daydream" (John Sebastian) – 2:10
"Take a Train" – 2:06
"Death Machine" – 2:23
"Swingin' in a Hammock" – 2:52

Personnel
Doug Clifford – lead vocals, drums, arrangements

Additional musicians
Stu Cook – lead and rhythm guitar
Donald Dunn – bass guitar
Steve Miller – piano
Greg Adams – trumpet
Mic Gillette – trombone, trumpet
Emilio Castillo – tenor saxophone
Skip Mesquite – tenor saxophone
Stephen Kupka – baritone saxophone
Eddie Bayers – vocals
Lynette Hawkins – vocals
Freddie Smith – vocals
Judiyaba – cello

Additional personnel
Bob Fogerty – photography
Russ Gary – engineer
Tony Lane – art direction

References

External links

1972 debut albums
Doug Clifford albums
Fantasy Records albums